The following is a timeline of the history of the city of Minsk, Belarus.

Prior to 19th century

 1066 - Vladimir the Great, Prince of Kiev.devastates the town.
 1067 - Battle on the Nemiga River occurs near Minsk.
 1101-1119 - Gleb Vseslavich the prince of Minsk.
 1104 - Town besieged by Kiev forces.
 1115 - Town besieged by Kiev forces again.
 1129 - Town becomes part of Kievan Rus.
 1242 - Town becomes part of Grand Duchy of Lithuania.
 1413 - Minsk becomes part of the Vilnius Voivodeship.
 1441 - City charter granted.
 1499 - Magdeburg rights granted.
 1505 - City besieged by Crimean Khanate army.
 1508 - City besieged by Muscovy forces.
 1552 - Town privileges extended.
 1566 - City becomes capital of Minsk Voivodeship.
 1569 - City becomes part of Polish–Lithuanian Commonwealth.
 1591 -  granted.
 1616 -  founded.
 1642 - Holy Spirit Cathedral (Minsk) built.
 1654 - Russo-Polish War (1654–1667): City occupied by the Russians.
 1667 - City restored to the Polish–Lithuanian Commonwealth.
 1673 - Church built at Kalvaryja.
 1685 - Yeshiva founded.
 1708 - Great Northern War: City occupied by the Swedes.
 1709 - Great Northern War: City occupied by the Russians.
 1710 - Jesuit church built.
 1793 
 City annexed by the Russian Empire following the Second Partition of Poland.
 Orthodox Diocese of Minsk (Belarusian Orthodox Church) established.
 1796 - City becomes capital of Minsk Governorate.
 1798 - Catholic diocese of Minsk formed.

19th century
 1801 - Independence Avenue (Minsk) opened, then called Zahariy Street
 1805 - Governor's Garden established.
 1808 - Kalvaryja cemetery in use (approximate date).
 1812
 Napoleon in power.
 November: Russian forces oust the French.
 1821 - Population: 2,000 (approximate).
 1825 - Pischalauski Castle built, now a prison.
 1827 - Population: 3,000 (approximate).
 1831 - Polish November Uprising.
 1836 -  established.
 1837 - Fire brigade in operation.
 1838 - Minskiye gubernskiye vedomosti newspaper begins publication.
 1840 - Military Cemetery established.
 1844 - Theatre opens.
 1845
 Public library established.
 Population: 20,000 (approximate).

 1846 - Moscow-Warsaw road laid out.
 1857 - Greek Catholic Cathedral of Saints Peter and Paul rebuilt.
 1860 - Population: 27,000.
 1864 - Church of Holy Trinity consecrated.
 1871 – Minsk railway station opened.
 1872 - Municipal water supply introduced.
 1873 - Vilnius railway station built.
 1882 - Population: 53,328.
 1886 -  newspaper begins publication.
 1890 - Kupala Theatre opens.
 1892 – Horse tram begins operating.
 1897 - Population: 91,494.
 1898 - Russian Social Democratic Labour Party founded in Minsk.

20th century

1900s-1940s
 1902 - "All-Russian Congress of Zionists" held in Minsk.
 1910 - Church of Saints Simon and Helena consecrated.
 1911 - Tolstoy library founded.
 1913 - Population: 117,600.
 1914 - Minsk teachers institute founded.
 1917
 November: "Bolshevik troops arrive in Minsk."
 December: First All-Belarusian Congress meets in city.
 1918
 February: German forces oust Bolsheviks.
 25 March: "First All-Belarusian Congress declares independence of the Belarusian Democratic Republic."
 1919
 8 January: City becomes capital of Byelorussian Soviet Socialist Republic.
 August: City captured by Polish troops during Operation Minsk, part of the Polish–Soviet War.
 1920
 July: Soviet forces take city.
 Belarusian State Polytechnic Institute established.
 Theatre opens.
 1921
 Aleksandrovsky, Lyakhovsky, and Central administrative districts created.
 Belarusian State University established.
 City hosts first All-Belarusian Conference of Librarians.
 1923 -  founded.
 1924 - Consulate-General of Poland established.
 1926 - January: City hosts first Congress of Belarusian Archeologists and Archeographers.
 1927 - Sovetskaya Belorussiya newspaper begins publication.
 1929 – Electric tram begins operating.
 1930 - Minsk State Medical Institute founded.
 1931 - Belarusian Young Spectators' Theatre established.
 1932 - Belarusian State Conservatory, and Kamaroúski Park established.
 1933
 Minsk-1 Airport begins operating.
 Opera and Ballet Theatre and Belarusian Institute for National Economy established.
 1934
 Dynama Stadium built.
 Government House, Minsk completed.
 1937 - Kurapaty death camp begins operating near city.
 1938 - Kaganovich, Stalin, and Voroshilov administrative districts created.
 1939
 Soviet Belarus film studio relocates to Minsk.
 National Opera and Ballet of Belarus building opens.
 Belarusian State Art Gallery established.
 Population: 238,948.

 1940 - Soviet executions of Polish officers and intelligentsia during the Katyn massacre.
 1941
 June: Bombing of Minsk.
 June 28: German occupation begins.
 July 17: Reichskommissariat Ostland established.
 July 20: Minsk Ghetto established.
 August: Forced labour camp for Jews established.
 1942
 January: Stalag 352 prisoner-of-war camp established by the Germans.
 May: Maly Trostenets extermination camp in operation.
 1943
 State Archive for Film established.
 November: Stalag 352 camp dissolved.
 1944
 4 July: Red Army takes city.
 Minsk Automobile Plant established.
 Belarusian Great Patriotic War Museum opens.
 Zvyazda newspaper in publication.
 1945 - Belarus Theatrical Institute founded.
 1946
 Minsk Tractor Works established.
 Belarusian Institute of Technology relocates to Minsk.
 1948 - Minsk Institute for Foreign Languages founded.

1950s-1990s
 1950
 Yanka Kupala Park and Pobieda Kino (cinema) established.
 Tarpeda Stadium built.
  active.
 1954
 Minsk Wheeled Tractor Plant founded.
 Victory Square monument erected.
 1955
 Children's Railroad opens.
 Vasily Ivanovich Sharapov becomes mayor.
 1957 - Belarusian State History Museum established.
 1959
 Minsk Refrigerator Plant established.
 Population: 509,667.
 1961 - October Square, Minsk construction completed.
 1963 - MKAD (Minsk) ring road constructed.
 1964 - Radioengineering Institute established.
 1967 - Vecherniy Minsk newspaper begins publication.
 1968 - Stadium of the VSS Red Banner opens.
 1970
 Belarusian State Musical Comedy Theatre active.
 Population: 917,428.
 1971 - Belarus Optical & Mechanical Enterprise founded.
 1979
 Belarusian History Museum opens.
 Population: 1,333,000.

 1981 - Biennial puppet festival begins.
 1982 - Minsk National Airport begins operating.
 1984
 Minsk Metro begins operating.
 Minsk Zoo opens.
 1988 - 30 October: Demonstration; crackdown.
 1989
 19 February: "Rally of 'informals.'"
 30 September: Environmental protest.
 1989 - Population: 1,607,077.
 1990 - Public Library of the City of Minsk established.
 1991
 April: Labor strike.
 City becomes capital of Republic of Belarus.
 City "becomes the headquarters of the successor to the Soviet Union, the Commonwealth of Independent States."
 State Security Committee of the Republic of Belarus (KGB HQ) formed.
 Belarusian Nature and Environment Museum and Academy of Public Administration founded.
 1992 - International Sakharov Environmental University and Republican Institute for Vocational Education established.
 1993
 July: Belarusians of the World congress held in city.
 Listapad (Minsk International Film Festival) begins.
 1994 - Polish Institute in Minsk established.
 1995 - Vladimir Yermoshin becomes mayor.
 1996
 November: "Chernobyl march."
 National Academic Bolshoi Ballet Theatre of the Republic of Belarus and National Academic Opera Theatre of Belarus formed.
 1999
 30 May: Nyamiha metro disaster.
  built.
 2000
 15 March: Political demonstration held.
 Mikhail Pavlov becomes mayor.
 Darida Stadium opens.

21st century

2000s
 2001 - March: Anti-Lukashenko demonstration.
 2002
 Minsk Passazhirsky railway station and Football Manege arena built.
 MKAD (Minsk) ring road rebuilt.
 Independence Square, Minsk reconstruction completed.
 October: Library of the Polish Institute in Minsk established.
 2004
 Kurapaty monument installed.
 IIHF World U18 Championships held.
 2005 - 14 May: Water féerie demonstration.
 2006
 March: Jeans Revolution.
 November: Summit of Commonwealth of Independent States.
 National Library of Belarus building opens.
 2007 - March: Anti-Lukashenko demonstration.
 2008 - 4 July: Bombing.
 2009 - Ў Gallery founded.

2010s
 2010
 December: Post-election demonstration.
 Minsk-Arena opens.
  becomes mayor.
 2011
 11 April: Metro bombing.
 Protests against Lukashenko regime.
 2012
 4 July: Teddy bear airdrop.
 Population: 1,901,700.
 2014
 May: 2014 Ice Hockey World Championship held in city.
 Andrei Shorets becomes mayor.
 Population: 1,921,807 city; 2,101,018 metro.
 2015 - 12 February: International meeting produces ceasefire agreement ("Minsk II") related to the War in Donbass.

See also
 History of Minsk
 Timeline of Minsk governance
 Timeline of technology in Minsk
 Minsk population growth
 History of Minsk with timeline (in Belarusian Taraškievica)

References

This article incorporates information from the Belarusian Wikipedia and the Russian Wikipedia.

Bibliography

External links

 Europeana. Items related to Minsk, various dates.
 Digital Public Library of America. Items related to Minsk, various dates

Minsk
Minsk
Minsk